Marshall James (born 4 October 1970 from Llanelli) is a retired Welsh professional darts player from Wales, whose only high-profile success in the game so far was being runner-up in the 1997 BDO World Championship, in his debut year at the championships. He is also known for his slow, deliberate throwing style.

Career

His 1997 Embassy World title run started with victory over Bill Burksfield in the first round 3–1. He then beat Andy Fordham, a future world champion himself, in the second round, again by 3–1. Deciding set wins over American Roger Carter and defending champion Steve Beaton (in the sudden death leg, finishing with a 106 checkout after Beaton had narrowly missed one dart at double 10 for the match) sent him into the final. In the final against Scotland's Les Wallace, James looked impressive in the earlier sets of the match and was unfortunate to trail 2-3 at the interval. Wallace gained increasing momentum after the interval while James' momentum faded away fast. Wallace dominated the later sets, winning the final by a comfortable 6–3 by the end.

James only made two more appearances at Lakeside when he was beaten in the first round in 1998 by Richie Burnett and in the second round in 1999 by Steve Duke.

He was a member of the Welsh World Cup darts winning team in 1997. Wales won the Overall World Cup and Team Event in that year. He also teamed up with Martin Phillips, Sean Palfrey and Ritchie Davies as Wales won the 1998 WDF Europe Cup.

The only significant title that James won in his short career came at the 1997 Welsh Open in his home country having been a finalist in 1991 and quarter-finalist in 1992.

In 2003, he qualified for the UK Open, a PDC tournament but was knocked out in the very early rounds to Mark Thomson.

World Championship Results

BDO

1997: Runner Up (lost to Les Wallace 3–6)
1998: First Round (lost to Richie Burnett 1–3)
1999: Second Round (lost to Steve Duke 1–3)

References
Marshall James profile dartsdatabase

Living people
Welsh darts players
1970 births
Professional Darts Corporation associate players
British Darts Organisation players